Stain is the third studio album by American rock band Living Colour. It was released on March 2, 1993, by Epic Records. It is the first album to feature bassist Doug Wimbish. Stain features a generally heavier sound with more pessimistic themes, the songs representing a range of genres. It peaked at #26 on the Billboard 200. Citing "musical differences" the band split up in January 1995.

The cover art shows a woman wearing a brank.

From the mid-1990s through the early 2010s, the album was out of print due to rights issues after a lawsuit from Jon Stainbrook of the band The Stain forced Sony to cease production of the album. In November 2013, the album was reissued by Music On CD and is also available as an MP3 download. In June 2018, the album was reissued on limited edition green vinyl.

Track listing

Personnel
Living Colour
 Corey Glover – vocals
 Vernon Reid – guitars, guitar synthesizer
 Doug Wimbish – bass, ambiance
 Will Calhoun – drums

Guest musicians
 Andrew Fairley – vocals on "Hemp"
 Bernard Fowler – backing vocals

Technical Personnel
 Ron Saint Germain – production, recording, mixing
 Andre Betts – additional production
 Bob Ludwig – mastering
 Carol Chen – art direction
 Amy Guip – photography
 Mouri Mbonika – cover model

Charts

Weekly charts

Year-end charts

References

1993 albums
Living Colour albums
Epic Records albums
Albums produced by Ron Saint Germain
Albums recorded at Long View Farm